Shavon, also rendered as Shadoon and Shaun, may refer to:
 Shavon-e Olya
 Shavon-e Sofla